ECIS may refer to:

European Committee for Interoperable Systems
European Conference on Information Systems
European Council of International Schools
Electric cell-substrate impedance sensing
Eindhoven Centre for Innovation Studies, a research centre based at the School of Innovation Sciences at Eindhoven University of Technology
Evaluación de la Calidad en Interpretación Simultánea, a research group on simultaneous interpreting, based at the University of Granada